Kourtney Horner, known by her stage name Kourtney Hansen (born c. 1980) is an American entrepreneur, actress, dancer, and on-air radio personality who had a recurring role as Emily on the television series Nashville. She is married to Jeremy McComb.

Background
She was born and raised in Des Moines, Iowa. As Kourtney Horner, she was a 2003 graduate of Drake University in theatre, earning a Bachelor of Fine Arts degree. Upon graduation, she co-founded Paw Pro's, an in home pet care business, with her childhood friend Kristin Duax. She has experience as a morning radio onair sidekick for Hatfield and McCoy on Des Moines' KJJY. She also worked in professional theatre. She moved to Nashville in 2008. After moving to Nashville, Hansen founded Paw Pro's Tennessee there and turned over her Paw Pro's Iowa business to her mother.

Career
She is dance team captain for the Nashville Predators and has performed in music videos such as Keith Urban's 2008 "Sweet Thing", Luke Bryan's 2009 "Do I" and Jeremy McComb's 2008 "This Town Needs a Bar". "Do I" won the USA Weekend Breakthrough Video of the Year at the 2010 CMT Music Awards. She joined CMT in 2010, where she is a correspondent on CMT Insider. She is also a broadcast personality for the Predators.  She landed her role on Nashville, where she plays the assistant to Hayden Panettiere's Juliette Barnes, through her Nashville talent agent Mark Block. At The Block Agency website, Hansen is listed as a  talent. She has starred in commercials for NV Energy PowerShift and 1-800-PetMeds.

Personal life
In September 2012, she was engaged to Jeremy McComb. The couple wed on May 4, 2013. Kourtney has two sons names are Knox McComb and Ryker Aurelius McComb. She has two half brothers who are her senior. Her grandfather owned the Iowa School of Beauty. Her mother's name is Kathy.

Notes

External links

Living people
21st-century American actresses
American stage actresses
American television actresses
Drake University alumni
Actresses from Des Moines, Iowa
1981 births